Pekka Elomaa (1948–1995) is a Finnish film actor best known for his roles in the 1983 James Bond spoof Agent 000 and the Deadly Curves opposite actors Ilmari Saarelainen and Tenho Sauren.  He also appeared in the 1992 film Pirtua, pirtua, and the 1982 film Likainen puolitusina. All three films were directed by Visa Mäkinen.

External links

1948 births
1995 deaths
People from Pori
Finnish male film actors
20th-century Finnish male actors